Takashi Takeda (born 20 February 1940) is a Japanese alpine skier. He competed in two events at the 1960 Winter Olympics.

References

1940 births
Living people
Japanese male alpine skiers
Olympic alpine skiers of Japan
Alpine skiers at the 1960 Winter Olympics
Sportspeople from Hokkaido